Kulan Kuh (also Romanized as Kūlān Kūh; also known as Kalān Kūh) is a village in Gharbi Rural District, in the Central District of Ardabil County, Ardabil Province, Iran. At the 2006 census, its population was 418, in 87 families.

References 

Towns and villages in Ardabil County